Merriam-Webster's Geographical Dictionary (Webster's Geographical Dictionary, Webster's New Geographical Dictionary) is a gazetteer by the publisher Merriam-Webster. The latest edition was released in 2001, edited by Daniel J. Hopkins and contained over 54,000 entries. The first edition was published in 1949 and the second edition in 1972.

The dictionary has currently over 54,000 alphabetically arranged entries of mountains, lakes, towns, and countries. It includes almost all places in the United States with a population greater than 2,500. The threshold for inclusion of places outside the U.S. varies (from those over 4500 in Canada to those over 100,000 in Bangladesh and China). Included are 250 maps in black and white.

Editions
Webster's Geographical Dictionary: A Dictionary of Names of Places, With Geographical and Historical Information and Pronunciations. 1949. Springfield, MA: G. & C. Merriam Co. 1293 pages, 40,000 entries, 24 colored and 153 b/w maps.
Webster's New Geographical Dictionary. 1972. Springfield, MA: G. & C. Merriam Co. 47,000 entries, 218 maps.
Merriam-Webster's Geographical Dictionary, 3rd ed. 1997. Springfield, MA: Merriam-Webster Inc. 1,361 pages, 48,000 entries.
 Merriam-Webster's Geographical Dictionary, 3rd rev. ed. 2001. Springfield, MA: Merriam-Webster Inc. 1,392 pages, 54,000 entries, 252 maps.

Similar works
 Columbia-Lippincott Gazetteer of the World. Cohen, Saul B. (ed.). 1998. Columbia University Press. 3578 pages, 165,000 entries
Lippincott's New Gazetteer: A Complete Gazetteer or Geographical Dictionary of the World. 1905. Heilprin, A. and L. (eds.). Philadelphia: J.B. Lippincott Co.
Longmans' Gazetteer of the World. Chisholm, George C. (ed.). 1895. London and New York: Longmans, Green and Co., about 74,000 names.

External links
MW books page

English dictionaries